KRKS (990 kHz "990 The Word") is a commercial AM radio station licensed to Denver, Colorado.  The station is owned and operated by Salem Media Group and it airs a Christian talk and teaching radio format.  Its studios and offices are located on South Vaughn Way in Aurora, with the AM transmitter located on East 56th Avenue in North Washington.  KRKS with co-owned KRKS-FM; together, are known as "The Word," but carry most programs at different times of the day.

KRKS is powered at 6,500 watts by day; because AM 990 is a Canadian clear channel frequency, KRKS must reduce power at night to only 390 watts.  During critical hours at sunrise and sunset, the station broadcasts at 4,200 watts.

Programming
KRKS airs updates from SRN News at the top and bottom of each hour. Programming on KRKS-AM-FM includes "Insight for Living with Chuck Swindoll," "Grace to You with John Macarthur," "Pathway to Victory" with Robert Jeffress, "Focus on the Family with Jim Daly," "Truth for Life" with Alistair Begg, "In Touch with Dr. Charles Stanley," "Leading the Way with Dr. Michael Youssef," and "Haven Today" with Charles Morris. Most shows are paid brokered programming with the hosts asking for donations to support their ministry. "The Eric Metaxas Show", syndicated by the Salem Radio Network, airs from 1:00 to 2:00pm, and from 10:00pm to midnight.

History
On August 1, 1953, the station first signed on as KLIR.  It was a 1,000 watt daytimer, required to be off the air at night.  It was owned by George Basil Anderson during many of its early years.  In 1959, Anderson put KLIR-FM on the air (now KIMN).

In the 1970s, KLIR got a boost to 5,000 watts, but it still had to sign off at sunset. On November 1, 1970 the call sign was changed to KRKS, and the station switched to a religious format, and eventually becoming the heritage and oldest Christian Radio station in the Denver market; while KLIR-FM continued as a beautiful music station.  In the 1980s, KRKS was granted authorization by the Federal Communications Commission (FCC) to broadcast around the clock, but at the reduced nighttime power of 390 watts.

In 1993, Salem Communications paid $400,000 to acquire KRKS. Salem owned Christian radio stations in several dozen large and medium markets around the United States, and continued KRKS's format. The following year, 94.7 FM was bought by Salem and paired up with AM 990, as KRKS-FM.

Expanded Band assignment

On March 17, 1997 the FCC announced that eighty-eight stations had been given permission to move to newly available "Expanded Band" transmitting frequencies, ranging from 1610 to 1700 kHz, with KRKS authorized to move from 990 to 1650 kHz.

A construction permit for the expanded band station, also located in Denver, was assigned the call letters KBJD on August 10, 1998. The FCC's initial policy was that both the original station and its expanded band counterpart could operate simultaneously for up to five years, after which owners would have to turn in one of the two licenses, depending on whether they preferred the new assignment or elected to remain on the original frequency. However, this deadline has been extended multiple times, and both stations remain authorized. One restriction is that the FCC has generally required paired original and expanded band stations to remain under common ownership.

References

External links

FCC History Cards for KRKS (covering 1952-1980 as KLIR / KRKS)

RKS
RKS
Radio stations established in 1961
Salem Media Group properties